Cha Hun (born July 12, 1994) is a South Korean singer and actor. He is a member of the South Korean band N.Flying.

Career 
In 2015, Cha debuted as the guitarist of N.Flying. He runs a YouTube channel named Two Idiots together with his bandmate, Jae-hyun since September 2018. He made his acting debut in the web series Woof & Meow – Do you Love Me?, which he played as the male lead of the series.

Personal life 
Cha's role models are Gun N' Roses guitarist Slash, and Mark Tremonti from the rock band Creed.

Military enlistment 
On February 2, 2023, FNC Entertainment announced that Cha would be enlisted on March 20, 2023. He would later serve as a member of military band.

Discography

Singles

Filmography

Web series

References 

1994 births
Living people
South Korean male actors
South Korean male idols
South Korean male singers